Westfield St Lukes, one of the big three shopping centres in the western suburbs of Auckland, New Zealand, stands on St Lukes Road in the suburb of Mount Albert. It receives about 6 million shopper visits annually. With 43,000 m² gross floor area (2002 data), it features a Farmers, Kmart, Countdown, an Event Cinemas 8 screen cinema complex and over 160 shops.

The centre opened in 1971 and is one of the oldest in New Zealand. About 100,000 people visited it on opening day. Partly to change this, Westfield invested around NZ$55 million in the early 2000s to extend and renovate the centre.

In a 2008 rating of New Zealand shopping centres by a retail expert group, Westfield St Lukes received three and a half stars, just under the maximum rating of four stars, based on the criteria of amount of shopping area, economic performance, amenity and appeal as well as future growth prospects.

Annual sales for the full year 2018 were $363.1 million.

Expansion plans 
In 2009, Westfield applied for a change to the District Plan which would allow the shopping centre to be extended to 92,500m2, with up to 77,500m2 of shops and cafes as well as 15,000m2 of office space and up to six storeys of building – which would make the centre larger than any other shopping centre in New Zealand. Westfield already own much of the properties in the north of the site, where it wants to expand, but some neighbours and groups have announced they will fight the mall expansion, primarily because of the extra traffic effects.

See also
 List of shopping centres in New Zealand

References

External links

 Westfield St Lukes

Shopping centres in the Auckland Region
Shopping malls established in 1971
Saint Lukes, Auckland
1970s architecture in New Zealand
Buildings and structures in Auckland